1958 Miles is a compilation album by American jazz musician Miles Davis, released in 1974 on CBS/Sony. Recording sessions for tracks that appear on the album took place on May 26, 1958, at Columbia's 30th Street Studio and September 9, 1958, at the Plaza Hotel in New York City. 1958 Miles consists of three songs featured on side two of the LP album Jazz Track, which was released in November 1959, one song from the same session not appearing in the album ("Love for Sale"), and three recordings from Davis' live performance at the Plaza Hotel with his ensemble sextet. The recording date at 30th Street Studio served as the first documented session to feature pianist Bill Evans performing in Davis' group.

The sessions for tracks on the album in mid-1958, along with the Milestones sessions from earlier that year, were seen by many music writers as elemental in Miles Davis' transition from bebop to the modal style of jazz and were viewed as precursors to his best-known work, Kind of Blue. Following audio engineering and digital restoration by engineer Larry Keyes at Sony Music New York Studio, the album was reissued on compact disc in 1991 as part of Columbia's Jazz Masterpieces Series. For later reissues, the album was retitled as '58 Sessions Featuring Stella by Starlight or 58 Miles Featuring Stella by Starlight. The complete 1958 sessions for Columbia were issued on the box set The Complete Columbia Recordings of Miles Davis with John Coltrane, and Jazz at the Plaza was reissued in 2001. The first four tracks were also released on a bonus disc of the 50 Anniversary Collector's Edition of Kind of Blue.

Background

In 1958, Miles Davis was one of many jazz musicians growing dissatisfied with bebop, seeing its increasingly complex chord changes as hindering musical creativity. Five years earlier, jazz pianist, composer and theorist George Russell published his Lydian Chromatic Concept of Tonal Organization (1953), which offered an alternative to the practice of musical improvisation based on chords. Abandoning the traditional major and minor key relationships of classical music, Russell developed a new formulation using musical scales, or a series of scales, for improvisations. Russell's approach to improvisation came to be known as modal in jazz. Davis viewed Russell's methods of composition as a means of getting away from the dense chord-laden compositions of his time, which Davis had labeled as "thick".

In contrast to the conventional method of composing during the time, modal compositions were to be written as a series of sketches in which each performer is given a set of scales that defines the parameters of their improvisation. Modal composition, with its reliance on musical scales and modes, represented, as Davis called it, "a return to melody". According to Davis, "Classical composers—some of them—have been writing this way for years, but jazz musicians seldom have". In early 1958, Davis began using this approach with his sextet, a jazz ensemble made up of alto sax player Julian "Cannonball" Adderley, tenor saxophonist John Coltrane, pianist Red Garland, bassist Paul Chambers, and drummer Philly Joe Jones. Influenced by Russell's ideas, Davis implemented his first modal composition with the title track of Milestones (1958), which was based on two modes, recorded in April of that year. Instead of soloing in the straight, conventional, melodic way, Davis's new style of improvisation featured rapid mode and scale changes played against sparse chord changes. Davis' acclaimed collaboration with Gil Evans on Porgy and Bess gave him an opportunity to experiment with Russell's concept, as Evans' third stream compositions for Davis contained only a musical scale and no chords, the basis for modality.

The sextet
Following the Milestones sessions, Davis made significant personnel changes. By the time Coltrane had returned from Thelonious Monk's quartet to Davis's sextet, pianist Red Garland and drummer Philly Joe Jones were replaced by Bill Evans and Jimmy Cobb. Problems with money, tardiness, attitude and heroin preceding the Milestones sessions troubled Garland and Jones. During one of these sessions, an incident occurred between Davis and Garland when he was playing piano on the song "Sid's Ahead". Apparently, Davis leaned over his pianist's shoulder, commenting on his piano playing. What was said by Davis is still unknown, but it was enough to make Garland leave the studio, leaving Davis to play piano on the track and straining the friendship between the two musicians.

Evans was subsequently hired by Davis for his rich precision and ability to understate the piano's solo voice. While Davis was fascinated and taken with the new sound Evans brought and the challenges it inspired, the remainder of the band, including Julian "Cannonball" Adderley, preferred Garland's harder, more rhythmic sound. In a 1960 column for Down Beat, Adderley elaborated on his initial reaction to the change, stating "Especially when he started to use Bill Evans, Miles changed his style from very hard to a softer approach. Bill was brilliant in other areas, but he couldn't make the real things come off." Despite his preference for a harder piano style, Adderley opened up to the new sound. He later used Bill Evans on a July 1958 session for his Portrait of Cannonball LP. Evans' unique piano sound and Davis' experiments with modal jazz would culminate on the '''58 Sessions. Documented in a studio session from May 1958 at Columbia's 30th Street Studio and a live gig at the Plaza Hotel's Persian Room in September of that same year, these sessions marked the advent of Davis' new sextet, during what had already become a pivotal year for Davis.

Music

Studio session

Featured as the first side of 1958 Miles, the May 26 session took place at Columbia's 30th Street Studio in New York City. The songs recorded were previously issued on the second side of Jazz Track, an LP that consisted mostly of songs composed by Davis for the soundtrack to the 1958 French film Ascenseur pour l'échafaud. In contrast to the mood pieces composed for the film, the May session featured Davis' growing curiosity in modal jazz and the relationship of fewer chords and variations with melody. This was the first studio session to feature Bill Evans and Jimmy Cobb in the new sextet, recording on Davis' thirty-second birthday.

A different aesthetic was in place during the session, as Bill Evans' first rhapsodic, impressionistic chords on "On Green Dolphin Street" highlighted the mid-tempo track, while Jimmy Cobb's brush technique grooved behind Davis' trumpet solo. John Coltrane and "Cannonball" Adderley doubled and tripled-up their syncopations over Paul Chambers' transparent counterpoint, as Cobb and Evans pealed away on their instruments, sharing solos with Davis, Addeley and Coltrane. The contrast between hot melodic variations and cool, laid back swing gave the whimsical "Fran Dance" (according to Ira Gitler's liner notes, the song was named after Davis' wife Francis), the romantic "Stella by Starlight", and the jumping "Love for Sale" their elemental tension. This contrast represented Davis' transitional stage between bebop and modality; standard chords and musical variety. The sessions were also notable for featuring Coltrane's unique improvisational style, known as the sheets of sound. Coltrane employed extreme and dense improvisational, yet patterned, lines that consisted of high speed arpeggios and scale patterns played in rapid succession; hundreds of notes running from the lowest to highest registers. "Stella by Starlight" featured Evans' delicate and sparse introduction, which made Coltrane's early solo seem startling. Evans' lush and laconic solo suggested the bittersweet spell he would cast over the Kind of Blue sessions the following year.

Live performance
The live portion of the album was recorded in the Persian Room of New York's Plaza Hotel at a September jazz party given by Columbia Records to celebrate "the healthy state of jazz" at the label. Later issued in full as Jazz at the Plaza in 1973, the live set featured three staples of Davis' and Coltrane's concert repertoire during their collaborating years. The sextet opened up with the standard "Straight, No Chaser", composed by Thelonious Monk. The musicians took the number at a brisk tempo, and though Jimmy Cobb lacked former drummer Philly Joe's technical flair, he and Paul Chambers remained consistent, as the horns carried into whirling solos. Evans used Adderley's solo and the song's tempo to improvise, as he scattered Bud Powell-like clusters. Journalist Lindsey Planer later called the performance "slippery and triple-jointed", and went on to state "The band plays as if Monk might have been in the room that night. This is Davis at his most muted magnificence."

The Sonny Rollins-penned "Oleo" followed along at a wild Paul Chambers bass tempo, as Evans' fluid orchestral piano technique suggested multiple key centers and modal impressions. In contrast to the high tempos and improvisation of the other live tunes, "My Funny Valentine" was stately and serene, as Coltrane and Adderley sit out, giving Evans and Davis a more meditative backdrop for sensitive soloing. Evans displayed his soft and sensitive piano style. His unique and challenging sound was one of the reasons Miles Davis had hired him following Philly Joe's departure. The late-night languor of "My Funny Valentine", along with Bill Evans' presence and the more consistent and improving sextet, would hint at the music later featured on Davis' next album, the 1959 jazz masterpiece Kind of Blue.

Reception and legacy

As parts of Jazz Track and Jazz at the Plaza, respectively, the 58 Sessions chronicled the transition from the brawny agitation of Milestones, to the cerebral tranquility of Kind of Blue. The recording sessions also became known as a stepping stone in Davis' move from bebop to modal jazz. The live side in particular was seen by critics as a glimpse at the sextet that would record Kind of Blue. The complimentary and seemingly spontaneous style of performance ethic and the relationship between Davis and his musicians was fundamental for his work during these sessions and improved onto the Kind of Blue sessions.

Jazz historian and journalist Ira Gitler has considered 1958 Miles to be one of Davis' best works, while also noting that he was "very taken with the performances", alluding to the album's recordings after Gitler had listened to them. In the 1979 LP reissue liner notes, Gitler wrote "These prime cuts of the Miles Davis Sextet, representative of what this most influential leader and his trendsetting band of that time, were doing in that particular portion of 1958, are a most welcome addition to the collectors library." The live portion of the album recorded at The Plaza Hotel was noted by critics as an early stage of the new sextet. Music writer Nicholas Taylor later wrote of the Plaza set:

Prior to the live session, Miles Davis had already established a reputation as one of the jazz era's top live performers, following well-received performances at such venues as Birdland, also known as "The Jazz Corner of the World", in New York and the Newport Jazz Festival in Rhode Island during the mid-1950s. The set at the Plaza Hotel further expanded Davis' repertoire in concert venues and increased his popularity among jazz fans and writers. Even though Milestones was Davis' first use of modes and Cannonball Adderley's presence helped make the band became a more powerful sextet, these sessions helped introduce Bill Evans to the music of Miles Davis. The May 26 session, in particular, exposed Evans to Davis' spontaneous ability in the studio to simplify complicated musical structures. In a 1979 interview for the jazz radio station WKCR, Evans remarked on his recording experience with Davis, stating "Miles occasionally might say, 'Right here, I want this sound', and it turn out be a very key thing that changes the whole character of the [song]. For instance, on 'On Green Dolphin Street', the original changes of the chorus aren't the way [we recorded it]: the vamp changes being a major seventh up a minor third, down a half tone. That was [one when] he leaned over and said, 'I want this here.'" Evans' influence would be apparent on the Kind of Blue sessions as it was during the initial 1958 sessions. All recorded studio work by Davis from 1958 for Columbia was later reissued on the box set compilation The Complete Columbia Recordings of Miles Davis with John Coltrane. Following the implementation of his first modal compositions with the title track of Milestones and his first sessions with Bill Evans, the 1958 Sessions, Davis became satisfied with the results. This led to his preparation of an entire album based on modality, his 1959 masterwork, Kind of Blue.

Track listing

Original LP
Side oneRecorded at Columbia's 30th Street Studio, New York, New York, on May 26, 1958. "On Green Dolphin Street" (Kaper, Washington) – 9:48
 "Fran Dance" (Davis) – 5:48
 "Stella by Starlight" (Young, Washington) – 4:41
 "Love for Sale" (Porter) – 11:43

Side twoRecorded live at The Plaza Hotel, New York, New York, on September 9, 1958. "Straight, No Chaser" (Monk) – 10:57
 "My Funny Valentine" (Rodgers, Hart) – 10:05
 "Oleo" (Rollins) – 10:48

Bonus trackThe 1979 and 2006 Sony Japan release featured only side one and a bonus cut. "Little Melonae" (McLean) – 7:22

Personnel
Musicians
Miles Davis – trumpet, leader
Julian "Cannonball" Adderley – alto saxophone
John Coltrane – tenor saxophone
Bill Evans – piano
Paul Chambers – bass
Jimmy Cobb – drums

Production
Teo Macero – producer
Larry Keyes – engineer, remastering
Ira Gitler – liner notes
Masuo Ikeda – Jacket cover art
Mike Berniker – reissue, digital producer

Release history
Originally released in 1974 (not 1958) on CBS/Sony Records, 1958 Miles has had a rather convoluted release history. The album has experienced many reissues under different titles and records labels, along with a variety of release date listings.

References

 Bibliography 
 
 
 
 
 
 

External links
 ModalJazz.com
 1958 Miles, '58 Sessions Featuring Stella by Starlight'' at Discogs

1958 compilation albums
Miles Davis albums
Columbia Records albums
Albums produced by Teo Macero
Albums recorded at CBS 30th Street Studio
Instrumental albums
Hard bop compilation albums
Modal jazz compilation albums